Jan Meyerowitz (23 April 1913 – 15 December 1998) was a German–American composer, conductor, pianist and writer.

Life 
Meyerowitz was born Hans-Hermann Meyerowitz in Breslau (today Wrocław), the son of a manufacturer. From 1927, he studied in Berlin with Walter Gmeindl and Alexander von Zemlinsky. In 1933, he was forced to leave Germany because he was Jewish and continue his education in Rome with Ottorino Respighi, Alfredo Casella and the conductor Bernardino Molinari. In 1938, he moved to Belgium and in 1939 to the South of France, where he made contact with the French Resistance. His future wife, the singer Marguerite Fricker, helped him in Marseille to survive the Nazi occupation of France.

In 1946 Meyerowitz emigrated to the U.S. and became an assistant to Boris Goldovsky, director of the opera program at Tanglewood. In 1951 he became an American citizen. Meyerowitz taught at Brooklyn College (1956–1962) and at the City College of New York. In 1956 Meyerowitz was awarded the first of two Guggenheim Fellowships. After his retirement, he returned to France where he died in Colmar.

Selected works

Compositions

Stage works 
 Simoon (1949). Opera in one act. Libretto: Peter John Stephens (after August Strindberg). Premiere 2 August 1949 Tanglewood / Massachusetts
 The Barrier (Die Schranke or The Mulatto, Il Mulatto; 1949). Opera in 2 acts. Libretto: Langston Hughes. Premiere 18 January 1950 New York (Columbia University)
 Emily Dickinson (earlier: Eastward in Eden; 1951). opera in 4 acts. Libretto: Dorothy Gardner. Premiere 16 November 1951 Detroit)
 2. acts as separate pieces: The Meeting. UA 16. September 1955 Falmouth / Massachusetts
 Bad Boys in School (1952). opera-farce in one act. Libretto: Jan Meyerowitz (after Johann Nestroy). Premiere 17 August 1953 Tanglewood / Massachusetts
 Esther (1957–60). Opera in one act. Libretto: Langston Hughes. Premiere 4 August 1960 Tanglewood / Massachusetts
 Godfather Death (1960/61). Chamber opera in 3 acts. Libretto: Peter John Stephens. Premiere 1 June 1961 New York
 Die Winterballade oder Die Doppelgängerin (1966/67). Opera in 3 Acts. Libretto: Jan Meyerowitz (after Gerhart Hauptmann). Premiere 29 January 1967 Staatsoper Hannover; Conductor: Reinhard Petersen

Vocal compositions 
 The Five Foolish Virgins. Cantata
 The Story of Ruth for coloratura and piano
 Missa Rachel Plorans (1954). mass for choir a cappella
 The Glory Around His Head (1955). Easter cantata for middle voices, 4-voice mixed choir and piano. Libretto: Langston Hughes
 How Godly Is the House of God for 4-voice mixed choir and piano. Libretto: Langston Hughes
 Emily Dickinson Cantata. Libretto: Dorothy Gardner
 New Plymouth Cantata for soloist, 4-voice mixed choir and piano. Libretto: Dorothy Gardner
 Hérodiade. Text: Stéphane Mallarmé
 Arvit Shir hadash l'shabbat (Ein neues Lied für den Sabbat). premiere 1962 New York (Park Avenue Synagogue; Cantor: David Putterman)
 Hebrew Service (1962)
 Fünf Geistliche Lieder (1963) for bass and orchestra (2.2.2.2 – 4.2.3.1 – harp – timpani, percussion – strings)
 Other cantatas, songs and song cycles with lyrics E. E. Cummings, Robert Herrick, John Keats, Arthur Rimbaud and others

Orchestral works 
 Midrash Esther (1954). symphony. premiere 1957 New York (New York Philharmonic, Conductor: Dimitri Mitropoulos)
 Flemish Overture (1959) for orchestra (3.3.3.3 – 4.3.3.1 – harp – percussion – strings)
 Oboenkonzert (1962; orchestra: 2.0.2.2 – 4.2.2.0 – harp – timpani, percussion – strings)
 Flötenkonzert
 Four Movements for Wind Symphony (1974)
 Four Romantic Pieces for Concert Band (1978)
 Three Comments on War for Concert Band (1964)

Chamber music 
 Streichquartett (1936–55)
 Sonata for violine and violoncello
 Short Suite for Brass (3.3.2.1)

Writings 
 Arnold Schönberg. Berlin (Colloquium) 1967 (Köpfe des 20. Jahrhunderts, volume 47)
 Der echte jüdische Witz. Berlin (Colloquium) 1971. re-issue: Berlin (arani) 1997.

Bibliography 
 Hans-Jürgen Winterhoff and Helmut Loos (edits.): Fünf schlesische Komponisten des 20–Jahrhunderts. Ernst August Voelkel (1886–1960), Fritz Lubrich (1888–1971), Edmund von Borck (1906–1944), Jan Meyerowitz, Martin Christoph Redel (born 1947). Bonn (Schröder) 1994 (Deutsche Musik im Osten, volume 4).

References 

Jewish emigrants from Nazi Germany to France
Musicians from Wrocław
American male composers
American male conductors (music)
1913 births
1998 deaths
20th-century American conductors (music)
20th-century American composers
20th-century American pianists
American male pianists
20th-century American male musicians
Brooklyn College faculty
Jewish emigrants from Nazi Germany to the United States